The Marchen script was a Brahmic abugida which was used for writing the extinct Zhang-Zhung language. It was derived from the Tibetan script.

Script
As per McKay (2003), Zhang-zhung script has been modelled after Thonmi Sambhota's Tibetan script:
"There is also a Zhang-zhung alphabet, but despite its rather unusual appearance to anyone who is unfamiliar with the Indo-Tibetan ornate style of lettering known as lan-tsha, one observes that it is modeled letter by letter upon Thon-mi Sambhota's alphabet of thirty letters."

A number of scripts are recorded as being used for writing the Zhang-Zhung language:

 Marchen or Greater Mar script
 Marchung or Lesser Mar script
 Pungchen or Greater Pung script
 Pungchung or Lesser Pung script
 Drusha script

These scripts have mostly been observed in calligraphy manuals. One extant document, a seal originally held at Tsurpu monastery, is written in the Marchen script.

Description
The Marchen scripts has some similarities with the Tibetan scripts and Lantsa but at the same time differs considerably from these. It also differs from other writing systems in the Bon tradition, such as Marchung, Pungchen, Pungchung and Drusha. A feature the Marchen script shares with Tibetan script and Lantsa are the special subjoined variants of the letters wa, ya and ra. The vowel diacritics are most similar to those of Drusha. A distinguishing feature of the Marchen script is the presence of a left-facing swastika, a symbol of the Bon religion, which is used both to write the letter nya and as a punctuation mark.

Each consonant has an accompanying vowel a which can be modified with the four vowel diacritics. Consonant clusters are written just like in Tibetan script by stacking two or more consonants on top of each other vertically. Just as in Tibetan script, there are simplified forms for medial w, y and r. However, there is no simplified form of initial r. Unlike in Tibetan script, there is no sign to mark syllable boundaries, which means that ambiguities can sometimes arise.

The Marchen script can be written in two different styles: one with thick angular letters and one with thin rounded ones.

Alphabet

Vowels

Consonants

Signs

Unicode
Marchen script was added to the Unicode Standard in June, 2016 with the release of version 9.0.

The Unicode block for Marchen is U+11C70–U+11CBF:

References

Brahmic scripts
Obsolete writing systems